Stefano Bianca is a Swiss architectural historian and an urban designer. Bianca has been published in the fields of Islamic architecture, cities, gardens and arts.

He is currently working as Director of the Historic Cities Support Program.

References

21st-century Swiss historians
Living people
Swiss urban planners
Year of birth missing (living people)